Muaaz Al Salemi (Arabic:معاذ السالمي ) (born 15 August 1996) is a Qatari footballer. He currently plays for Al-Shamal.

External links

References

Qatari footballers
Qatari expatriate footballers
1996 births
Living people
Al-Gharafa SC players
Al-Wakrah SC players
Al-Shamal SC players
Expatriate footballers in Austria
Qatari expatriate sportspeople in Austria
Qatari expatriate sportspeople in Spain
Expatriate footballers in Spain
Qatar Stars League players
Association football midfielders
FC Red Bull Salzburg players